The Circus Cowboy is a 1924 American silent Western film directed by William A. Wellman and produced and distributed by Fox Film Corporation.

Plot
As described in a film magazine review, returning home from Africa, Buck Saxon finds that his sweetheart, Norma Wallace, is married to Ezra Bagley, a wealthy miser. Buck interferes to save Norma when her stepson Paul threatens her. When the younger Bagley is shot and killed by the father in mistake for Buck, Buck gets the blame. Escaping, he joins a circus where Bird Taylor, a young woman who loves him, works as a tightrope walker. Buck entertains the public by performing riding feats. An animal trainer is jealous of Buck, and cuts the rope while Bird Taylor is doing her stuff in the air. Buck spoils this little game by catching Bird expertly as she is hurdling to the floor. Ezra Bagley tacks down Buck but is finally forced to admit the truth regarding the slaying of his son. Vindicated, Buck weds Bird.

Cast

Preservation
With no prints of The Circus Cowboy located in any film archives, it is a lost film.

References

External links

 
 

1924 films
1924 drama films
1924 lost films
1924 Western (genre) films
American black-and-white films
Circus films
Films directed by William A. Wellman
Fox Film films
Lost American films
Lost Western (genre) films
Silent American Western (genre) films
1920s American films